Alucita dohertyi is a species of moth of the family Alucitidae. It is known from Kenya, Tanzania and Uganda.

References

Alucitidae
Insects of Uganda
Insects of Tanzania
Moths of Africa
Moths described in 1909